The 2022 McNeese Cowboys football team represented McNeese State University as a member of the Southland Conference during the 2022 NCAA Division I FCS football season. They were led by head coach Gary Goff, who was coaching his first season with the program. The Cowboys played their home games at Cowboy Stadium in Lake Charles, Louisiana.

Preseason

Preseason poll
The Southland Conference released its preseason poll on July 20, 2022. The Cowboys were picked to finish fourth in the conference.

Preseason All–Southland Teams

Schedule

Game summaries

at No. 4 Montana State

at Rice

vs. Alcorn State

vs. Mississippi College

at No. 11 Incarnate Word

vs. Texas A&M-Commerce

at Nicholls

vs. Southeastern Louisiana

vs. Eastern Illinois

at Houston Christian

vs. Lamar

Statistics

References

McNeese State Cowboys
McNeese Cowboys football seasons
McNeese State Cowboys